Lucinda is a female given name of Latin origin, meaning light. It can be abbreviated as Lucy or Cindy. 

The name may refer to:

People
 Lucinda Armstrong Hall, Australian actress
 Lucinda Ballard (1906–1993), American costume designer
 Lucinda Banister Chandler (1828–1911), American social reformer, author
 Lucinda Bruce-Gardyne, Scottish chef and writer
 Lucinda Collins, Australian pianist
 Lucinda Cowden (born 1965), actress on the Australian soap opera Neighbours
 Lucinda Creighton (born 1980), Irish politician
 Lucinda Foote, American student
 Lucinda Barbour Helm (1839–1897), American author, editor, women's religious activist 	
 Lucinda Jenney (born 1954), American actress
 Lucinda Pullar (born 1998), Australian rules footballer and former soccer player
 Lucinda Riley (1965–2021), Northern Irish author and actress
 Lucinda Todd (1903–1996), African-American teacher and education activist
 Lucinda Williams (born 1953), American rock, folk and country music singer and songwriter
 Lucinda Williams (athlete) (born 1937), American athlete
 Lucinda "Lucy" Sanders (born 1954), CEO and co-founder of the National Center for Women & Information Technology
 Lucinda Hinsdale Stone (1814–1900), American feminist, educator, traveler, writer, philanthropist

Fictional characters
 Lucinda Walsh, a fictional character on the CBS soap opera As the World Turns
 Lucinda Embry, a haunted girl who predicted apocalyptic events through numerology in the film Knowing
 Lucinda Leplastrier, the heroine from Peter Carey's 1988 novel Oscar and Lucinda
 Lucinda Merrill, wife of protagonist Neddy Merrill in John Cheever's 1964 short story "The Swimmer"
 Lucinda, a fictional witch character in the television series Sofia the First   
 Lucinda Allen, RJ's childhood crush, and later, his girlfriend, in the novel Welcome Home Roscoe Jenkins
 Lucinda Perriweather, a well-meaning but misguided and often unhelpful fairy who gave the "gift" of obedience to Ella in the film Ella Enchanted

Songs
 "Lucinda", by Tom Waits from the album Orphans: Brawlers, Bawlers & Bastards
 "Lucinda", by The Knack from the album Get the Knack
 "Lucinda", by post punk industrial funk band A Certain Ratio, from the album Sextet

Others
 Lucinda, Queensland, a town in Australia
 Lucinda (steam yacht), a steam yacht of the Queensland Government

References

English feminine given names